Brett P. Smiley (born 1978 or 1979) is an American politician from Rhode Island. A member of the Democratic Party, he is the mayor of Providence, Rhode Island.

Early life and career
Smiley is from Illinois. He attended DePaul University, earning a bachelor's degree and a Master of Business Administration. He moved to Rhode Island to work for Lieutenant Governor Charlie Fogarty's campaign in the 2006 Rhode Island gubernatorial election. After the election, Smiley worked for David Cicilline, the mayor of Providence, and opened a political consulting firm.

In December 2013, Smiley announced his candidacy for mayor of Providence in the 2014 election, seeking to succeed Angel Taveras, who did not run for reelection so that he could run for governor of Rhode Island. He dropped out of the mayoral race in August 2014 and endorsed Jorge Elorza, the eventual winner. Elorza named Smiley the city's chief operating officer after the election. In September 2016, he became the chief of staff to Governor Gina Raimondo. In December 2019, Raimondo named Smiley as the new head of the Rhode Island Department of Administration. He resigned in February 2021.

Mayor of Providence
After his resignation, Smiley announced his candidacy for mayor of Providence in the 2022 election, seeking to succeed Jorge Elorza, who was prevented from running for a third term due to term limits. He won the Democratic primary in September 2022 with 42% of the vote, while Gonzalo Cuervo received 36% and Nirva LaFortune earned 22%. He faced no opposition in the November 8 general election and took the oath of office on January 2, 2023.

Personal life
Smiley's husband, Jim DeRentis, is a real estate agent.

References

DePaul University alumni
LGBT mayors of places in the United States
Living people
Mayors of Providence, Rhode Island
Politicians from Providence, Rhode Island
Rhode Island Democrats
Year of birth missing (living people)
1970s births